The Married Women's Property Act 1870 (33 & 34 Vict c 93) was an Act of Parliament of the United Kingdom that allowed married women to be the legal owners of the money they earned and to inherit property.

Background

Before 1870, any money made by a woman (either through a wage, from investment, by gift, or through inheritance) instantly became the property of her husband once she was married, with the exception of a dowry. The dowry provided by a bride's father was to be used for his daughter's financial support throughout her married life and into her widowhood, and also a means by which the bride's father was able to obtain from the bridegroom's father a financial commitment to the intended marriage and to the children resulting therefrom. It also was an instrument by which the practice of primogeniture was effected by the use of an entail in tail male. Thus, the identity of the wife became legally absorbed into that of her husband, effectively making them one person under the law.

Once a woman became married, she had no claim to her property, as her husband had full control and could do whatever suited him regarding the property: "Thus, a woman, on marrying, relinquished her personal property—moveable property such as money, stocks, furniture, and livestock--- to her husband's ownership; by law he was permitted to dispose of it at will at any time in the marriage and could even will it away at death". For example, any copyrighted material would have the copyright pass to the husband on marriage. This would be analogous to copyright of the work done as part of the employment being owned by the employer. Even in death, a woman's husband continued to have control over her former property. Before the Act was passed, women lost all ownership over their property when they became married: "From the early thirteenth century until 1870, English Common law held that most of the property that a wife had owned as a feme sole came under the control of the husband at the time of the marriage".

Married women had few legal rights and were by law not recognized as being a separate legal being – a feme sole. In contrast, single and widowed women were considered in common law to be femes sole, and they already had the right to own property in their own names. Once a woman became married, she still had the right to legally own her land or house but she no longer had the right to do anything with it, such as rent out a house that she owned or sell her piece of land: "Thus, a wife retained legal ownership of her real property—immovable property such as housing and land, but she could not manage or control it; she could not sell her real property, rent it, or mortgage it without her husband's consent". She could not make contracts or incur debts without his approval. Nor could she sue or be sued in a court of law. Only the extremely wealthy were exempted from these laws – under the rules of equity, a portion of a married woman's property could be set aside in the form of a trust for her use or the use of her children. However, the legal costs involved in establishing trusts made them unavailable to the vast majority of the population.

Women started to try to get the act passed in the 1850s, a group of women had campaigned for the law to be amended with no success. One important woman taking up the cause was Barbara Bodichon (1827–1891). She promoted women's rights and in 1854 published A Brief Summary of the Laws in England concerning Women: together with a few observations thereon. She worked hard to reform the married women's property laws. As an artist, she also helped establish the Society for Female Artists in 1857. In 1865, she founded the women-only Kensington Society, for which she wrote Reasons for the Enfranchisement of Women in 1866. She was also an intimate friend of George Eliot (the pen name of Mary Ann Evans), who wrote Middlemarch.

In 1868, efforts to get the act passed were revived; in that year, a Married Women's Property Bill was introduced into parliament, which proposed that married women should have the same property rights as unmarried women. A long and energetic campaign by women's groups and some men led to the passing of this Act.

The Married Women's Property Act 1870 provided that wages and property which a wife earned through her own work or inherited would be regarded as her separate property and by the Married Women's Property Act 1882, this principle was extended to all property, regardless of its source or the time of its acquisition. The Act also protected a woman not only from her husband gaining control of her property but also from people that worked for him, his creditor, "These acts generally exempted married women's property from attachments by creditors of their husbands".

This gave married women a separate statutory estate and released them from coverture. It was for the first time theoretically possible for married women to live away from their husbands and support children. Widowed women with children, as femes soles, had already had the right to own property and support their children.

Contents of the act
The most important sections of the act were:

 The wages and earning made by a wife were to be held by her for her own separate use, independently from her husband. The meaning of wages included money made from any employment, occupation, or trade, or the use of any skill such as a literary, scientific, or artistic skill that resulted in money being made. This section also covered investments made with the money earned.
 This section dealt mostly with the inheritance of property. A wife was allowed to keep any property she inherited from her next of kin as her own, subject to that property not being bound in a trust. She could also inherit money up to £200.
 This section allowed a married woman to continue to hold rented property in her own name and to inherit rented property.
 This section made married women liable to maintain her children from the profits earned from her personal property. It also continued the liability of the husband to maintain his children. In effect, this section made both parents legally liable while each spouse held separate property.

Shortcomings
The Act dealt mostly with the earnings of married women and was not very specific about married women's property rights. A major loophole was that any personal property (personalty) as opposed to real property a woman had in her own name before marriage still legally became her husband's property, money, furniture, stocks and livestock. Women married thereafter were entitled up to a fairly good sum of property (£200) in their own names ("absolutely") from their next of kin.  It did not speak for an amount in excess of £200. The act was not retrospective — all women who married before it could not recover into their sole name the property they had held before marriage (if they had any). This greatly limited the effect.

Legacy

The act's full significance was that, for the first time in British history, it allowed newly married women to forever legally keep their own earnings and inherit property. It also put a legal duty on married women to maintain their children alongside their husband's. Women who married before the act still ceded ownership over their property. They also did not have authority over any children that they bore during the marriage, which "deprived her of all authority over her children and of any contractual capacity during his [her husband's] life". When this Act was passed it was in a time when women had very few rights. Women were not allowed to vote in parliamentary elections; It could be argued that the act paved the way towards women's right to vote, since it extended female property rights. It sidelined one of the reasons women were denied the right: "Coverture was also used as a reason to deny women the vote and public office because of the assumption that a married woman would be represented by her husband. The end of coverture certainly ranks along with suffrage as the sine qua non [inception] of public recognition of women's autonomy and personhood". Women before were not seen as individuals who could have their own vote let alone be elected; their husbands by tradition would take control of such matters. The Act helped lay the groundwork for a superseding, enhanced-rights version, the Married Women's Property Act 1882 and for the 1918 Representation of the People Act that granted many women over the age of thirty the right to vote in the United Kingdom.

Criticism 

Much negative feedback to Parliament flowed when the Married Women's Property Act was passed in 1870. Some people said that the Act was not focused on benefiting women and it was actually focused on the fraud that married couples commit: "Court cases argues that the passage of the British Act had more to do with controlling fraud committed by married couples (who colluded to defeat the law of debt) than the rights of married women". This opinion was controversial because many feminists saw this Act as a huge success for women who were married. This way of thinking is taking the focus from being on women back to the couple as a whole.

Another criticism that came about was that there was not much discussion of equality between men and women. There was a focus put on the arguments in the home that would arise from this new Act being passed: "The most striking feature of the debates on the Married Women's Property Bills is how little time was spent discussing the principle of sexual equality, and how much time was spent discussing the idea that giving married women property rights would cause discord in the home". It is surprising that there was not much discussion about equality because when the Act was passed it made married women's rights over their possessions more equal to the rights that married men had over their possessions. The idea that each spouse would be equal to one another was one that some men of that time found completely absurd: "Arthur Rackham Cleveland, J. E. G. de Montmorency, and Dicey all condemned the common law doctrine of spousal unity as 'barbarous' or 'semi-civilized'." Instead of talk of equality there was talk about how negative the act was for the household because it would be the cause of arguments at the home. It was said that a house can only be a truly happy home if the husband was in charge and the wife was submissive: "There was no place in the Victorian home for disputes between husbands and wives if the home was to be the 'sweetest, cheerfullest place' that the husband could find refuge in. Within the terms of separate spheres ideology, this household harmony could only be achieved by the total subordination of women to their husbands".

Footnotes

Works cited

See also
Coverture
Married Women's Property Act 1882

Further reading
 The text of the act
 

Property law of the United Kingdom
United Kingdom Acts of Parliament 1870
Women's rights legislation
Women's rights in the United Kingdom
1870 in women's history